The following is a comprehensive discography of Warrant, an American glam metal band from Los Angeles, California, that experienced its biggest success in the late 1980s/early 1990s. The band has released a total of nine studio albums with international sales of albums and singles combined at approximately 10 million. The band first came into the national spotlight with their double platinum debut album Dirty Rotten Filthy Stinking Rich, and one of its singles, "Heaven," reached #2 on the US Billboard Hot 100. The band continued its success in the early 1990s with the double platinum album Cherry Pie which provided the hit album titled song.

Their success began to wane somewhat after that, but they did release the gold album Dog Eat Dog. The band started to experience frequent changes to the line-up and despite the drop in popularity, they released Ultraphobic in 1995 and a greatest hits album in 1996. The band also changed their musical direction with the release of the grunge infested Belly to Belly in 1996, but returned to their roots when the album didn't reach sales expectations. Warrant went on tour in 2000s, released a new covers album Under the Influence, and saw lead singer Jani Lane leaving the band. An album entitled Born Again was released with new singer Jaime St. James, and there was a brief reunion of the original line up. Into the new decade former lead singer and main songwriter Jani Lane died.
After more than 30 years, the band is still recording music and performing, now with ex-Lynch Mob vocalist, Robert Mason.

Since their debut in 1989, they have released nine studio albums, one live album, four compilation albums, and have had thirty three singles released.

Albums

Studio albums

Live albums

Compilation albums

Singles

Soundtrack appearances

Video albums

Music videos 

 Music videos were made for all the songs from the album Born Again in 2006 but only "Bourbon County Line" and "Dirty Jack" were released as singles.

References

External links
 

Discographies of American artists
Heavy metal group discographies
Rock music group discographies